Brachiolia obscurana is a species of moth of the family Tortricidae. It is found in South Africa.

References

Endemic moths of South Africa
Moths described in 1966
Tortricini
Moths of Africa
Taxa named by Józef Razowski